Swędrowski, feminine: Swędrowska is a Polish-language surname. Notable people with this surname include:
 (1999-2012), Polish basketball player
Tomasz Swędrowski (disambiguation), several people
Tomasz Swędrowski (footballer) (born 1993), Polish football midfielder
 (born 1960), Polish volleyball player, journalist, and sports broadcaster

Polish-language surnames